Ambrose Dery (on 23 August 1956), a Ghanaian politician, is the Interior Minister and Member of Parliament for Nandom Constituency. He won the constituency during the 2016 elections on the ticket of the New Patriotic Party.

Biography
Hon. Dery is a legal practitioner who entered the University of Ghana in 1977 after completing Navrongo Secondary School and graduated with a Bachelor of Law (LL. B) and then called to the Bar in 1982. Before entering parliament in 2008, Hon. Dery was appointed Deputy Attorney General in 2003. He also served in two ministerial positions as the Regional Minister for the Upper West Region from 2004 to 2006 and Minister of State in the Ministry of Justice from 2005 to 2007. Hon. Dery served as the Deputy Minority Leader for the fifth parliament of Ghana. Hon. Dery won the Nandom parliamentary seat, then Lawra-Nandom Constituency in 2008 but lost the seat to Benjamin Kumbuor in the 2012 elections. Hon. Dery served as the Chairman of the Water Aid Partner Round Table, an association of local NGOs funded by Water Aid for ten years (1993-2003). on the list presented to parliament for approval on 21 January 2021,  Hon. Dery was nominated by the president to maintain his ministerial position as the Interior minister.

Personal life 
Ambrose is a Catholic and married with one child

Committees 
He was a member of the Constitutional, Legal and Parliamentary Affairs and also a member of Selection Committee.

References 

1956 births
Living people
Ghanaian Roman Catholics
Cabinet Ministers of Ghana
University of Ghana alumni
New Patriotic Party politicians
Ghanaian MPs 2021–2025